Felicity is an American drama television series created by J. J. Abrams and Matt Reeves and produced by Touchstone Television and Imagine Television for The WB. Brian Grazer and Ron Howard were executive producers through Imagine Entertainment.

The series revolves around the college experiences of the title character, Felicity Porter (portrayed by Keri Russell), as she attends the "University of New York" (based on New York University), which lies across the country from her home in Palo Alto, California. The show ran for four seasons from September 29, 1998, to May 22, 2002, with each season corresponding to the traditional American university divisions of freshman, sophomore, junior, and senior years.

In 2007, Felicity was one of Time magazine's "All-Time 100 Best TV Shows." AOL TV named Felicity one of the "Best School Shows of All Time." In June 2010, Entertainment Weekly named Felicity Porter one of the "100 Greatest Characters of the Last 20 Years".

Plot

The series opens at Felicity's high school graduation, where she asks Ben Covington, a classmate on whom she has a crush, to sign her yearbook. Moved by his comment that he wished they had gotten to know each other further, she changes her education plans completely, deciding to follow Ben to New York rather than attend Stanford University as a pre-med student. Felicity's overbearing parents, concerned about Felicity's seemingly rash decision, come to New York to try to persuade her to return home and "get back on track". Felicity has second thoughts about her decision, but soon realizes that she came not only to follow Ben, but to discover her true inner self.

While Felicity works to sort out her emotions, she continues the basic motions of student life and moves into her dorm. There, she meets the resident advisor Noel Crane. Eventually, the two develop a romantic relationship, and the love triangle among Felicity, Ben, and Noel forms the basic dramatic conflicts in the show throughout the series.

A number of other characters appear and play large roles in Felicity's life. Her roommate for the first two years is Meghan Rotundi, a goth Wiccan who occasionally casts spells on Felicity and others. Julie Emrick is one of Felicity's best friends, as is Elena Tyler, who often takes classes with Felicity. Felicity also has male friends, including Sean Blumberg, who is always trying to produce new off-kilter inventions, and Javier Clemente Quintata, who manages the Dean & DeLuca where Felicity works for most of her college career.

A recurring episode opener of the show is a stark camera shot of Felicity sitting in a dormitory room or apartment holding a tape recorder, recalling events in order to make a cassette tape to send to an old friend named Sally Reardon (voiced by Janeane Garofalo). This occasionally provides a method for Felicity to narrate an entire episode. At the end of episodes like this, Felicity is often shown to be listening to a tape that Sally has sent in reply.

Cast and characters

Characters are listed in title credit order and by appearance on the show.

Production

Setting
Felicity was filmed in part in New York City, and is set at the fictional University of New York (UNY), based on New York University (NYU). Like NYU, UNY is located in Greenwich Village near Washington Square Park, and the school is an important part of the show. Although like other universities, NYU normally welcomes being mentioned in film or on television as free product placement, the university refused permission for the show to use its name, stating that "[t]he negatives kind of outweighed the positives."

Writer's age
In 1999, a publicly hyped young writer for the show, Riley Weston, was disclosed as a fraud for claiming to be much younger than she truly was. At the age of 32, she began marketing herself to television studios as a recent high school graduate, passing off her husband as her older brother. She was soon hired by The WB as a writer for Felicity. Hailed as a child prodigy and "wunderkind", she was featured on Entertainment Weeklys October 1998 list of the "100 Most Creative People in Entertainment", which described her as an up-and-coming 19-year-old. Shortly thereafter, she was offered a six-figure screenwriting deal with Disney. Her real identity and age were exposed after a Felicity producer checked her social security number. Soon afterward, her contract with WB expired and was not renewed, and her deal with Disney fell through.

Time-slot and hairstyle changes
In the summer of 1999, after filming the first season, Felicity star Russell—known for what The New York Times described as "[t]hat glorious head of voluminous golden backlit hair"—sent the show's producers a photo wearing a short-haired wig. They panicked before learning that it was a joke but then suggested to the actress that a new hairstyle would be appropriate. After being shifted from Tuesday nights at 9:00 pm Eastern to Sunday nights at 8:00 pm Eastern (WB's weakest night) for the 1999–2000 season, the ratings for Felicity declined immediately. This decline occurred before the hair-style change, but the later hair-style change became conflated by some of the public and by some of the popular press and network executives with this earlier event and thus incorrectly blamed the earlier ratings drop partly on the later new hairstyle. After the negative reaction Russell rejected wearing extensions or a wig while her hair grew back. Although storytelling and time-slot changes had already created a ratings decline, a network executive said WB actors' future hair changes would "be given more thought at the network than it previously would have". In 2010, TV Guide Network listed the hairstyle change at No. 19 on their list of "25 Biggest TV Blunders," with several commentators arguing that it was the reason that the ratings of the show dropped. The haircut incident went on to become a popular culture reference within other television shows, both comedic and dramatic. Despite the controversy, Felicity survived for two more seasons.

Home media

Walt Disney Studios Home Entertainment released the DVDs over a period of four years. Because of high music licensing costs, many of the songs from the original broadcast episodes were replaced in the DVD releases, some of them with songs by artists from the independent label Rescue Records. Blaire Reinhard ("Over and Over" and "Can't Let Go"), Mike Schmidt ("Just Wave Goodbye"), and Beth Thornley ("Mr. Lovely") are some of the artists whose music was used for the DVDs but not the original broadcasts.

In a commentary track on the final episode of Disney/Buena Vista's original Freshman Year Collection DVD release ("Felicity Was Here"), co-creator Matt Reeves said the pilot and season finale contained the same music as when the show originally aired, but some other episodes contained changes. "One of the sad things about going into syndication is that certain rights that we were able to get in the first year we weren't able to get," Reeves said. "In the pilot and in this episode we have all the original music as it appeared on the series."

Some episodes did not have proper telecine encoding and when viewed on an HDTV, some interlacing artifacts are visible. All four seasons were re-released on DVD by ABC Studios on April 7, 2009, in "slimmer" packaging. These region 1 releases have been discontinued and are now out of print.

On February 9, 2012, it was announced that Lionsgate Home Entertainment had acquired the rights to the series and planned on re-releasing it. Seasons 1 and 2 were re-released on May 1, 2012, and do not contain any extras, subtitles, or other languages besides English. Seasons 3 and 4 were re-released on May 7, 2013.

Reception

Ratings
The series debut garnered 7.1 million viewers.

Accolades
Felicity was nominated for 38 awards during its run from 1998 to 2002 and won several, including an Emmy Award for Outstanding Cinematography for a Series for Robert Primes and Golden Globe Award for Best Actress – Television Series Drama for Keri Russell.

References

External links

 
 

1998 American television series debuts
2002 American television series endings
1990s American college television series
2000s American college television series
1990s American teen drama television series
2000s American teen drama television series
English-language television shows
Television series by ABC Studios
Television series created by J. J. Abrams
Television shows filmed in Los Angeles
Television shows set in New York City
The WB original programming
Television series by Imagine Entertainment
Works by Matt Reeves